The 2003–04 Idaho Vandals men's basketball team represented the University of Idaho during the 2003–04 NCAA Division I men's basketball season. Members of the Big West Conference, the Vandals were led by third-year head coach Leonard Perry and played their home games on campus at Cowan Spectrum in Moscow, Idaho.

Idaho met fifth seed UC Riverside in the quarterfinal of the conference tournament in Anaheim and defeated the Highlanders for their first-ever  victory in the Big West  The following night in the semifinal, they lost to second-seed Pacific by

Postseason results

|-
!colspan=5 style=| Big West tournament

References

External links
Sports Reference – Idaho Vandals: 2003–04 basketball season
Idaho Argonaut – student newspaper – 2004 editions

Idaho Vandals men's basketball seasons
Idaho
Idaho Vandals men's basketball team
Idaho Vandals men's basketball team